"Can't Get Enough" is a song by American hip hop recording artist J. Cole, released as the fourth single off his debut studio album Cole World: The Sideline Story. It was released on September 2, 2011, through Roc Nation and Columbia. The song, featuring R&B singer Trey Songz, was produced by Brian Kidd  and  samples "Paulette" as performed by Balla et ses Balladins.

Music video
The song's music video, filmed in Barbados, was directed by Clifton Bell. While in Barbados for his last performance as the official opening act for Rihanna's Loud Tour. Cole shot the video with Songz and Rihanna, who provided a cameo while in her hometown.

Chart performance
The song first charted on the week of October 29, 2011 on the US Hot R&B/Hip-Hop Songs at number eighty-six. It peaked at number seven. On August 30, 2016, the single was certified platinum by the Recording Industry Association of America (RIAA) for sales of over a million digital copies in the United States.

Charts

Weekly charts

Year-end charts

Certifications

Release history

References

2011 singles
2011 songs
J. Cole songs
Songs written by J. Cole
Trey Songz songs
Songs written by Trey Songz
Roc Nation singles
Columbia Records singles